Odd Fellows Hall is an historic building in Victoria, British Columbia, Canada. It is located at the intersection of Wharf Street and Fort Street in downtown Victoria, and it is now the location of The Keg restaurant.

See also
 List of historic places in Victoria, British Columbia

References

External links
 

1862 establishments in Canada
Buildings and structures completed in 1862
Buildings and structures in Victoria, British Columbia
Odd Fellows buildings